St. Agnes Academy-St. Dominic School is an independent Catholic school in Memphis, Tennessee consisting of an all-girls PK2-12th school and an all boys PK2-8th school. The school is located in the Diocese of Memphis and follows Catholic principles but is not run by the diocese. It was founded by Dominican sisters.

Background 
St. Agnes Academy-St. Dominic School serves girls from pre-kindergarten 2 (PK2) through twelfth grade and boys from pre-kindergarten 2 (PK2) through eighth grade.

History of St. Agnes Academy-St. Dominic School 
St. Agnes Academy was founded by the Dominican Sisters in January 1851 and chartered in January 1852. The founding Sisters were Magdalen Clark, Catherine McCormack, Vincentia Fitzpatrick, Ann Simpson Sr. Lucy Harper, and Emily Thorpe. Sisters Magdalen and Catherine were professed at St. Mary of the Springs, and the other four at St. Catharine, Kentucky. (The Dominican Sisters of St. Mary of the Springs and of St. Catharine, Kentucky, eventually merged, along with six other congregations, to become Dominican Sisters of Peace, the congregation that continues to sponsor the school today.) Sr. Catherine died in August and Mother Angela Lynch replaced her with Sr. Frances Conlon.

St. Agnes was situated in what were then the suburbs of Memphis (Vance and Orleans), about a mile and a quarter from Court Square, the center of the city. The doors were opened on February 4, 1851, with 20 boarders and about 15 day-students. When the school year ended on July 7, 1851, the enrollment had increased to more than 50, and an addition to the school had been completed. The Dominican Sisters also boarded orphans until 1864, when the Sisters opened St. Peter's Orphanage.

In the fall of 1867 and again in the fall of 1873, Memphis was enveloped by the yellow fever epidemic. During these times, many Dominican Sisters died rendering service to the sick in Memphis. On May 16, 1878, after the yellow fever had faded, the academy caught fire and was reduced to ashes. Another fire in 1900 caused less damage. Neither fire, however, hindered the School's continued operation.

In 1911, two wings were added to the building to accommodate the growing enrollment, a Romanesque Chapel and an auditorium. The community purchased the Porter property on the right side of St. Agnes. On October 5, 1918, the faculty of St. Agnes established the Memphis Conservatory of Music where students could acquire a B.A. degree in music. It became the formal music education center of Memphis for beginning, advanced and professional students. It was incorporated on August 4, 1923, and eventually formed the Department of Music at St. Agnes College.

In 1922 classes opened at St. Agnes College, the first Catholic women's college in the Diocese of Nashville and in the tri-states. It was the first college in Memphis to offer adult evening courses. It became evident that a separate location from the academy was needed if the college was to grow. To emphasize the distinction between the academy and the college, on January 1, 1939, the name of St. Agnes College was changed to Siena College. The college eventually moved to Poplar Avenue in 1953, and closed in 1972.

After 100 years at Vance and Orleans, St. Agnes Academy moved to its present site on Walnut Grove Road (Barbara Daush Blvd) in 1951. Ground was broken in 1956 for St. Dominic School, an elementary school for boys on the property with St. Agnes. A library/science portable building was added in 1974. A regulation soccer field and a quarter-mile running track were added in 1986.

The campus expanded over the years with the construction of Madonna Hall in 1966, the purchase of portable buildings in 1972, and the completion of an expanded and enhanced campus library in 1988. The Buckman/Davis Building was added to the campus in 1991 as the campus center for science and mathematics. Completing the Early Childhood Center and Tot Lot in 1998 accommodated the earliest grades. The opening of the a multipurpose building, Siena Hall, in 1999 allowed removal of all temporary structures and provided a pedestrian campus.

The "Reaching for the Stars and Suns" campaign created the Veritas Research Center, completed in 2008, which houses a Cybrary, Distance Learning Center, Multi-media Lab, Cyber Café, Senior Lounge, Tech Center and eight classrooms.  St. Agnes is planning to build a new Early Childhood Center in 2009. It is one of 18 schools in the country to be named an Apple Distinguished School.

, the School was operated as one entity by a board of trustees consisting of parents, local leaders and representatives of the Dominican Sisters of Peace.

The present school offers coeducational early childhood and kindergarten education for boys and girls ages two through five, single-sex classes for girls and boys in grades one through six, coordinated junior high classes for boys and girls in grades seven and eight, and college preparatory education for girls from grades nine through twelve.

Notable people
Nellie O'Donnell (1867–1931)

See also 
 Siena College (Memphis, Tennessee)
 Christian Brothers High School (Memphis, Tennessee)
 Christian Brothers University

References

External links 
 St. Agnes Academy-St. Dominic School
 Apple Distinguished School Profile

Educational institutions established in 1851
Girls' schools in Tennessee
Private K-12 schools in Tennessee
Roman Catholic Diocese of Memphis
Catholic secondary schools in Tennessee
Schools in Memphis, Tennessee
1851 establishments in Tennessee